Maul's searsid (Maulisia mauli), also called Maul's tubeshoulder, is a species of fish in the family Platytroctidae (tubeshoulders), named for Günther Maul.

Description

Photophores are weakly developed; a lateral line is present. Its thoracic photophore is a horizontal bar.

Habitat

References

Platytroctidae
Fish described in 1960
Taxa named by Albert Eide Parr